Neripteron vespertinum is a species of freshwater snail, an aquatic gastropod mollusc in the family Neritidae.

Distribution
This species is endemic to Hawaiʻi

References

External links
 Sowerby, G. B. II. (1849). Monograph of the genus Neritina. In G. B. Sowerby II (ed.), Thesaurus conchyliorum, or monographs of genera of shells. Vol. 2 (10): 507-546, pls. 109–116. London, privately published.
 Christensen, C. C.; Hayes, K. A.; Yeung, N. W. (2021). Taxonomy, conservation, and the future of native aquatic snails in the Hawaiian Islands. Diversity. 13(5): 215: 1-12

Aquatic organisms
Neritidae
Endemic fauna of Hawaii
Gastropods described in 1849